The wedge-snouted worm lizard (Geocalamus acutus) is a worm lizard species in the family Amphisbaenidae. It is found in Kenya and Tanzania.

References

Geocalamus
Reptiles described in 1912
Taxa named by Richard Sternfeld